Lazaros Tosounidis (born 23 February 1963) is a Greek cross-country skier. He competed in the men's 15 kilometre event at the 1984 Winter Olympics.

References

External links
 

1963 births
Living people
Greek male cross-country skiers
Olympic cross-country skiers of Greece
Cross-country skiers at the 1984 Winter Olympics
Sportspeople from Florina